Mustafa Atici (born 2 October 1969, Elbistan, Turkey) is a Swiss politician of Kurdish descent from the Social Democratic Party (SP) and a member of the Federal Assembly of Switzerland representing Basel-Stadt.

Education 
Mustafa Atici was born into a family of grain traders. Atici attended primary school in Elbistan, high school in Gaziantep and attended a further education in Istanbul. From 1987 to 1989 he began studying industrial engineering at Gazi University in Ankara. He moved to Cologne in 1992, but after he visited his relatives in Switzerland he moved to Basel. In 1992 he emigrated to Basel as a student. After arriving in Switzerland, he studied economics at the University of Basel from 1992 to 1995 and received a Master's degree at the European Institute of the University of Basel in 1998. After he graduated, he opened the first Döner in Basel.

Political career 
Since having arrived in Switzerland he was impressed by the federal administration and multilingualism of Switzerland and soon decided that he wanted to get involved in Swiss politics. He applied to become a citizen the day he was allowed to do so. Being raised in a family with a social democratic background, he joined the SP. As a representative of the SP, he was elected into the Grand Council of Basel-Stadt in 2005 and served as a member of the Grand Council until May 2019. In the Grand Council he advocated for a better framework for the Small and medium-sized enterprises (SMBs) and also the improvement of the education. He took part in a delegation of Swiss politicians around Balthasar Glättli to Diyarbakir and Van, serving as a translator in their interviews with imprisoned politicians like Hatip Dicle and Selma Irmak. After Turkey bombed the mainly Kurdish population in Afrin, Syria, and subsequently invaded and captured Afrin, he was a leading force behind a resolution of the Grand Council which condemned the Turkish invasion of Afrin. In the parliamentary elections in 2019 he was placed third in the Canton Basel-Stadt and since represents the Canton of Basel-Stadt in the Federal Assembly of Switzerland. In view of the earthquake in Syria and Turkey, he voiced support for an accelerated visa program for victims with relatives in Switzerland.

Personal life 
Atici is married and has two children. In 1990s six of his siblings lived in Switzerland. He is also a member of the Alevi cultural centre of Basel.

References 

Swiss politicians
Kurdish politicians
People from Elbistan
1969 births
Living people
Swiss people of Kurdish descent